Amaro José de São Tomás O.P.  (15 January 1747 – 18 July 1801) was a Portuguese clergyman, who was Prelate of Mozambico, Mozambique from 18 July 1783 and Titular Bishop of Pentacomia from 28 October 1785.

References

Portuguese Roman Catholic bishops in Africa
18th-century Roman Catholic bishops in Mozambique
Dominican bishops
18th-century Roman Catholic titular bishops
1747 births
1801 deaths
Roman Catholic bishops of Maputo